Ma Shaoxin (1936 – 15 March 2022) was a Chinese actor.

Biography
In 1956, Ma Shaoxin was admitted to the Jixi Mining District Cultural and Art Troupe, and has successively performed in many classic stage plays. In 1991 Ma appeared in the film Decisive Engagement: The Liaoxi-Shenyang Campaign and became the most successful actor playing Lin Biao, causing a huge sensation in the country.

Selected filmography
Coming Home (1983) as Uncle Ba-Liang
Decisive Engagement: The Liaoxi-Shenyang Campaign (1991) as Lin Biao
Battle of Kunlun Pass (1994)
The Great Military March Forward: Pursue and Wipe Out in the South (1997) as Lin Biao

References

External links
 
 Ma Shaoxin

1936 births
2022 deaths
Chinese film actors
Chinese stage actors
Male actors from Harbin